Pilares was a village located in northwest Presidio County, Texas, on the southern boundary of the Sierra Vieja near the Rio Grande. The uninhabited site is in the Trans-Pecos region of West Texas with a southern panorama of the Chihuahuan Desert and northern Mexico.

Presidio of Pilares
Presidio de Pilares, also known as El Principe, was established along the southern boundaries of the Rio Grande basin in the northern Chihuahua territory of New Spain in 1774. The Spanish Presidio provided a defensive wall against the native plains inhabitants during the Mexican Indian Wars in Spanish Texas.

History of Rio Grande presidios

In the mid-18th century, Charles III of Spain appointed Marquis of Rubí and José de Gálvez to fulfill expeditions and observations of the America frontier presidios in the northern regions of New Spain. 

On September 10, 1772, the Spanish Empire issued new regulations for presidios constructed in New Spain near the Rio Grande in the Northern Mexico territories. In 1776, the Viceroyalty of New Spain established Spanish provinces in the Spanish America frontier through the governance of the Provincias Internas serving as a supplemental article to the Bourbon Reforms. The Spanish Presidio coerced the territorial development of New Spain in the Chihuahua territory of the Spanish America colonies while fortifying the Spanish missions in Texas.

See also
Adams–Onís Treaty
Comanche Trail
French colonization of Texas
Nueva Vizcaya, New Spain
United States Camel Corps

References

Audiobook Bibliography

Bibliography

External links
 
 
 
 

Geography of Presidio County, Texas
Ghost towns in West Texas
History of Texas